Kalisz is a city in central Poland, and the second-largest city in the Greater Poland Voivodeship, with 97,905 residents (December 2021). It is the capital city of the Kalisz Region. Situated on the Prosna river in the southeastern part of Greater Poland, the city forms a conurbation with the nearby towns of Ostrów Wielkopolski and Nowe Skalmierzyce.

Kalisz is one of the oldest cities in Poland and one of the two traditional capitals of Greater Poland (alongside Poznań). It has served as an important regional center in Poland since the Middle Ages as a provincial capital and notable royal city. It is one of the historical burial sites of medieval Polish monarchs and dukes of the Piast dynasty and the site of a number of significant events in Polish history as well as several battles. Since the 19th century it has been the center of an industrial district. It is the cultural, scientific, educational and administrative center of the eastern and southern Greater Poland region, and the seat of Roman Catholic Diocese of Kalisz.

History 
There are many artefacts from Roman times in the area of Kalisz, indicating that the settlement had once been a stop of the Roman caravans heading for the Baltic Sea along the trade route of the Amber Trail. Calisia had been mentioned by Ptolemy in the 2nd century AD, although the connection is doubted by some historians who claim that the location mentioned by Ptolemy was situated in the territory of the Diduni in Magna Germania.

Middle Ages

 
Archaeological excavations have uncovered early medieval settlement from the Piast dynasty period, c. 9th–12th centuries.  Modern Kalisz was most likely founded in the 9th century as a provincial capital castellany and a minor fort. As part of the region of Greater Poland, i.e. the cradle of the Polish state, the town formed part of Poland since the country's establishment in the 10th century. 

In 1106, Bolesław III Wrymouth captured the town, and made it a part of his feudal domain. One of the richest towns of Greater Poland, during the feudal fragmentation of Poland it formed a separate duchy ruled by a local branch of the Piast dynasty. 

In 1264, the Statute of Kalisz was issued in the city by Bolesław the Pious. It was a unique protective privilege for Jews during their persecution in Western Europe, which in the following centuries made Poland the destination of Jewish migration from other countries. After Poland was reunited, the town became a centre of weaving and wood products, as well as one of the cultural centres of Greater Poland. 

In 1282 the city laws were confirmed by Przemysł II of Poland, and in 1314 it was made the capital of the Kalisz Voivodeship by King Ladislaus the Short. Located roughly in the centre of Poland (as its borders stood in that era), Kalisz was a centre of trade. Because of its strategic location, King Casimir III the Great signed a peace treaty with the Teutonic Order there in 1343. As a royal city, Kalisz managed to defend many of its initial privileges, and in 1426 a new town hall was built. The Polish Duke Mieszko III the Old was buried in Kalisz. In the 14th century, Jews of the town were attacked during epidemics by mobs which accused them of poisoning the wells of the town.

1500–1914

In 1574 the Jesuits came to Kalisz and in 1584 opened a Jesuit College, which became a centre of education in Poland; around this time, however, the importance of Kalisz began to decline somewhat, its place being taken by nearby Poznań.

The economic development of the area was aided by a large number of Protestant Czech Brothers, who settled in and around Kalisz after being expelled from Bohemia in 1620.

In the 18th century, one of two main routes connecting Warsaw and Dresden ran through the city, and Kings Augustus II the Strong and Augustus III of Poland often traveled that route. In 1789, 881 Jews lived in Kalisz, 29% of the city’s population.  In 1792, a fire destroyed much of the city centre. 

In 1793, in the Second Partition of Poland, the Kingdom of Prussia absorbed the city, called Kalisch in German. That year Jews were 40% of the population. In 1801, Wojciech Bogusławski set up one of the first permanent theatre troupes in Kalisz.

In 1807, Kalisz became a provincial capital within the Duchy of Warsaw. During Napoleon's invasion of Russia, following Yorck's Convention of Tauroggen of 1812, von Stein's Treaty of Kalisz was signed between Russia and Prussia in 1813, confirming that Prussia now was on the side of the Allies.

After the defeat of Napoleon Bonaparte, Kalisz became a provincial capital of Congress Poland and then the capital of a province of the Russian Empire. In the 1820s a special Jewish quarter was created where the third of the town that was Jewish was required to live; it existed until 1862.  Prussia and Russia held joint military exercises near the town in 1835. The proximity to the Prussian border accelerated economic development of the city and Kalisz ("Калиш" in Russian Cyrillic) started to attract many settlers, not only from other regions of Poland and other provinces of the Russian Empire, but also from German states. In 1860, 4,423 Jews lived in the town, 34.5% of its residents. During the January Uprising, on April 15, 1863, Polish insurgents fought two victorious clashes against the Russians near the city. In 1881, Russian authorities expelled Jewish residents who lacked Russian citizenship. In 1897, the Jewish population of the town was 7,580, about one-third of the total population.  

In 1902, a new railway linked Kalisz to Warsaw and Łódź. Since the 19th century, Kalisz was one of the leading Polish centers of piano manufacturing. In the early 20th century, it became the leading center, surpassing Warsaw.

World War I and interwar period

With the outbreak of World War I, the proximity of the border proved disastrous for Kalisz; it was one of the first cities destroyed in 1914. Between 2 and 22 August, Kalisz was shelled and then burned to the ground by German forces under Major Hermann Preusker, even though Russian troops had retreated from the city without defending it and German troops – many of them ethnic Poles – had initially been welcomed peaceably. Eight hundred men were arrested and then several of them slaughtered, while the city was set on fire and the remaining inhabitants were expelled. Out of roughly 68,000 citizens in 1914, only 5,000 remained in Kalisz a year later. By the end of the Great War, however, much of the city centre had been more or less rebuilt and many of the former inhabitants had been allowed to return.

After the war Kalisz became part of the newly independent Poland. On December 13, 1918, the First Border Battalion, composed of volunteers from Kalisz and Ostrów Wielkopolski, was sworn in Kalisz, before joining the ongoing Greater Poland uprising (1918–19) against Germany. The reconstruction continued and in 1925 a new city hall was opened. In the 1931 Polish census, Kalisz had a population of 15,300 Jews, nearly 30% of the city's total population.  In 1939 the population of Kalisz was approximately 81,000. The Jewish population of Kalisz at the time was 27,000.

World War II

After the German invasion of Poland in September 1939, the proximity of the border once again proved disastrous. Kalisz was captured by the Wehrmacht after Polish resistance, and the city was annexed by Germany. In revenge for resistance, the Wehrmacht carried out massacres of Polish defenders, who were executed both in the city and in the nearby settlement of Winiary (today, a district of Kalisz). Over 1,000 people were arrested as hostages. Numerous Poles were arrested and murdered during the Intelligenzaktion aimed at annihilation of the Polish intelligentsia. Around 750 Poles from Kalisz, Ostrów Wielkopolski, and other nearby settlements were imprisoned in the Kalisz prison from September 1939 to March 1940, and most were murdered in large massacres in the Winiary forest. In November 1939, the Einsatzgruppe VI Nazi paramilitary killing squad murdered 41 Poles at the local Jewish cemetery; among the victims was pre-war Polish mayor of Kalisz, Ignacy Bujnicki. In April and May 1940, many Poles arrested in the region, especially teachers, were imprisoned in the local prison, and afterwards deported to the Mauthausen and Dachau concentration camps, where they were murdered.

In Kalisz, the Germans established a Germanisation camp for Polish children taken away from their parents (Gaukinderheim). The children were given new German names and surnames, and were punished for any use of the Polish language, even with death (e.g., a 14-year-old boy  was murdered). After their stay in the camp, the children were deported to Germany; only some returned to Poland after the war, while the fate of many remains unknown to this day.

By the end of World War II approximately 30,000 local Jews had been murdered, and 20,000 local Catholics were either murdered or expelled to the more eastern part of German-occupied Poland (General Government) or to Germany as slave workers. In 1945 the population of the city was 43,000 – approximately half the pre-war figure. In 1945, Kalisz was restored to Poland, although with a Soviet-installed communist regime, which stayed in power until the Fall of Communism in the 1980s.

Following the war, Jewish Holocaust survivors returned to the city, by 1946 numbering some 500. By the late 1940s only some 100 remained, and those few who stayed blended into Polish society.

1950-present
In 1975, after Edward Gierek's reform of the administrative division of Poland, Kalisz again became the capital of a province – Kalisz Voivodeship; the province was abolished in 1998, however, and since then Kalisz has been the county seat of a separate powiat within the Greater Poland Voivodeship. In 1976, the city limits were greatly expanded by the incorporation of the surrounding settlements of Majków, Nosków, Piwonice and Szczypiorno as new districts. The Polish anti-communist resistance Movement for Defence of Human and Civic Rights issued independent underground press in the city. In August 1980, employees of local factories joined the nationwide anti-communist strikes, which led to the foundation of the Solidarity organization, which played a central role in the end of communist rule in Poland.

In 1991 the city festival was inaugurated on 11 June to commemorate the confirmation of the incorporation of the city in 1282. In 1992, Kalisz became the seat of a separate diocese of the Catholic Church. In 1997 Kalisz was visited by Pope John Paul II.

The city was the site of the former 'Calisia' piano factory, until it went out of business in 2007. The factory building was transformed into the Calisia One Hotel, which opened in 2019.

In November 2021, Polish far-right nationalists held an anti-semitic rally in Kalisz attended by hundreds of people. They burned a red-covered book meant to symbolize the 1264 Statute of Kalisz, historic pact protecting Poland's Jewish rights.

Climate
Kalisz has an oceanic climate  (Köppen climate classification: Cfb) using the  isotherm or a humid continental climate (Köppen climate classification: Dfb) using the  isotherm.

City neighborhoods

Religion 

There are 19 Catholic churches, five Protestant churches, and one Eastern Orthodox church in Kalisz. Synagogues were built in Kalisz beginning in 1698, and a New Synagogue was built in 1879. Before World War II there were 25,000 Jews in Kalisz, but most of them were murdered by Germans in the Holocaust in Poland and by the summer of 1942 the Jewish community in Kalisz was entirely destroyed.

Education 
Kalisz is a centre of education in the region. It is home to 29 primary schools, 15 junior high schools, and five high schools. Seven colleges and a dozen or so vocational schools are also located there. The city is also home to branches of Poznań University, Poznań University of Economics, and Poznań University of Technology, as well as other institutions of higher education. It is a home to the Henryk Melcer Music School.

Economy 
Although there is little heavy industry within the city limits, Kalisz is home to several large enterprises. It has the Winiary (part of the Nestlé group) and Colian food processing plants and the Big Star jeans factory. Two plane engine production factories, WSK-Kalisz and Pratt & Whitney Kalisz (a branch of Pratt & Whitney Canada), are located in Kalisz.

Cuisine 
The Andruty kaliskie wafers originated in Kalisz, and are the most well-known traditional food from the city in Poland.

Another officially protected traditional specialty of the area (as designated by the Ministry of Agriculture and Rural Development of Poland) are homemade cold pressed juices from fresh fruits of the Kalisz Region, produced according to traditional recipes without any additional ingredients. These include juices from apples, pears, cherries, blackcurrant, redcurrant, strawberries and raspberries. The tradition dates back several centuries.

Sports 

The district of Szczypiorno, as the place of pioneering games of handball in Poland, is the namesake for szczypiorniak, the Polish name of the sport. Other popular sports in Kalisz include football and volleyball. Notable sports teams include:
 MKS Kalisz – men's handball team playing in the Polish Superliga (top division; as of 2021–22)
 SSK Calisia Kalisz – women's volleyball team playing in the Polish Women's Volleyball League (top division; as of 2021–22), four times Polish Champions (1997, 1998, 2005, 2007)
 KKS Kalisz – men's football team playing in the II liga (as of 2021–22)

Transport 
Kalisz railway station was built in 1902 as the destination of the Warsaw–Kalisz Railway. It is currently served by Przewozy Regionalne and PKP Intercity.

Etymology
The name Kalisz is thought to stem from the archaic kal, meaning swamp or marsh.

Notable people 

 Adam Asnyk (1838–1897), poet
 Meir Auerbach (1815–1878), Polish-born Israeli, author and the first Ashkenazi Chief Rabbi of Jerusalem
 Shabbethai Bass (1641–1718), author and founder of Jewish bibliography
 Wojciech Bogusławski (1757–1829), actor, theater director and playwright
 Bolesław the Pious (1224/27–1279), duke of Greater Poland
 Krystyna Borowicz (1923–2009), actress
 Juliusz Bursche (1862–1942), bishop
 Maria Dąbrowska (1889–1965), writer
 Janina David, born Janina Dawidowicz (born 1930), writer and Holocaust survivor
 Solomon Eger (1785–1852), rabbi
 Agaton Giller (1831–1887), patriotic activist
 Stefan Giller (1833–1918), poet, an epigone of the Polish Romanticism
 Cyprian Godebski (1765–1809), freedom fighter and poet
 Avraham Gombiner (1635–1682), Jewish rabbi and scholar
 Adam Hofman (born 1980), politician
 Simon Horontchik (1889–1939), Polish-Yiddish novelist and short story writer 
 Julian Klemczyński (1807–1851), composer
 Augustyn Kordecki (1603–1673), prior of the Jasna Góra Monastery and hero of The Deluge
 Alfred Kowalski (1849–1915), painter
 Yehiel Krize  (1908–1968) Polish-born Israeli painter
 Jerzy Kryszak (born 1950), actor
 Theodor Meron (born 1930), Polish-born American president of the International Criminal Tribunal for the former Yugoslavia and judge in the International Criminal Tribunal for Rwanda
 Bonawentura Niemojowski (1787–1835), journalist
 Wincenty Niemojowski (1784–1834), journalist
 Ladislaus Pilars de Pilar (1874–1952), poet
 Leopold Pilichowski (1869–1933), realist painter
 Zofia Poznańska (1906–1942), anti-Nazi resistance fighter
 Adolph Moses Radin (1848–1909), rabbi
 Stanisław Saks (1897–1942), mathematician, member of the Polish Underground State, killed by the Gestapo
 Wojciech Siemion (1928–2010), actor and director
 Zdzisława Sośnicka (born 1945), singer
 Mischa Spoliansky (1898–1985), composer
 Jerzy Świrski (1882–1959), vice admiral
 Alina Szapocznikow (1926–1973), sculptor and Holocaust survivor
 Stefan Szolc-Rogoziński (1861–1896), traveler and explorer
 Stanislaw Szymanski (1862–1944), factory manager, industrialist, and activist
 Alicja Tchórz (born 1992), swimmer
 Marta Walczykiewicz (born 1987), sprint canoer, Olympic medalist
 Chaim Elozor Wax (1822–1889), Hasidic rabbi and philanthropist
 Stanisław Wojciechowski (1869–1953), president of Poland
 Jan Ptaszyn Wróblewski (born 1936), musician
 Iga Wyrwał (born 1989), glamour model
 Eve Zaremba (born 1930), Polish-born Canadian writer

International relations

Twin towns — Sister cities 
Kalisz is twinned with:

See also 
 History of the Jews in Kalisz
 Kalisz Department (Polish: Departament Kaliski): a unit of administrative division and local government in Polish Duchy of Warsaw in years 1807–1815
 Kaliszanie

References

External links 

 
 www.kalisz.pl
 Jewish Encyclopedia: "Kalisz” by Herman Rosenthal, Judah Eisenstein, and J. G. Lipman (1906).

 
Kalisz
9th-century establishments in Europe
Kalisz
Shtetls
Kalisz Governorate
Poznań Voivodeship (1921–1939)
Holocaust locations in Poland